The 2020–21 2. Liga is the 28th season of the 2. Liga in Slovakia, since its establishment in 1993.

Teams

Stadiums and locations

Personnel and kits
Note: Flags indicate national team as has been defined under FIFA eligibility rules. Players and Managers may hold more than one non-FIFA nationality.

League table

Results
Each team plays home-and-away against every other team in the league, for a total of 28 matches each.

Season statistics

Top goalscorers

Top Eleven
Source:
Goalkeeper:  Matúš Kira (FC Košice)
Defence:  František Pavúk (FC Košice),  Boris Godál (Podbrezová),  Michal Ranko (MFK Skalica),  Lukáš Migaľa (Banská Bystrica)
Midfield:  Erik Grendel (Podbrezová),  Richard Bartoš (Liptovský Mikuláš),  Wisdom Kanu (FK Slavoj Trebišov)
Attack:  Daniel Šebesta (MFK Skalica),  Roland Galčík (Podbrezová),  Róbert Polievka (Banská Bystrica)

Individual Awards

Manager of the season

 Stanislav Varga (Banská Bystrica)

Player of the Year

 Róbert Polievka (Banská Bystrica)

Young player of the Year

 Roland Galčík (Podbrezová)

References

External links

2020–21 in Slovak football leagues
2020-21
Slovak